In number theory, a Gaussian integer is a complex number whose real and imaginary parts are both integers.

Gaussian integers share many properties with integers: they form a Euclidean domain, and have thus a Euclidean division and a Euclidean algorithm; this implies unique factorization and many related properties. However, Gaussian integers do not have a total ordering that respects arithmetic. 

Gaussian integers are algebraic integers and form the simplest ring of quadratic integers.

Gaussian integers are  named after the German mathematician Carl Friedrich Gauss.

Basic definitions
The Gaussian integers are the set

In other words, a Gaussian integer is a complex number such that its real and imaginary parts are both integers.
Since the Gaussian integers are closed under addition and multiplication, they form a commutative ring, which is a subring of the field of complex numbers. It is thus an integral domain.

When considered within the complex plane, the Gaussian integers constitute the -dimensional integer lattice.

The conjugate of a Gaussian integer  is the Gaussian integer .

The norm of a Gaussian integer is its product with its conjugate.

The norm of a Gaussian integer is thus the square of its absolute value as a complex number. The norm of a Gaussian integer is a nonnegative integer, which is a sum of two squares. Thus a norm cannot be of the form , with  integer.

The norm is multiplicative, that is, one has

for every pair of Gaussian integers . This can be shown directly, or by using the multiplicative property of the modulus of complex numbers.

Euclidean division

Gaussian integers have a Euclidean division (division with remainder) similar to that of integers and polynomials. This makes the Gaussian integers a Euclidean domain, and implies that Gaussian integers share with integers and polynomials many important properties such as the existence of a Euclidean algorithm for computing greatest common divisors, Bézout's identity, the principal ideal property, Euclid's lemma, the unique factorization theorem, and the Chinese remainder theorem, all of which can be proved using only Euclidean division.

A Euclidean division algorithm takes, in the ring of Gaussian integers, a dividend  and divisor , and produces a quotient  and remainder  such that

In fact, one may make the remainder smaller:

Even with this better inequality, the quotient and the remainder are not necessarily unique, but one may refine the choice to ensure uniqueness.

To prove this, one may consider the complex number quotient . Taking , one has

with

and

This definition of Euclidean division may be interpreted geometrically in the complex plane (see the figure), by remarking that the distance from a complex number  to the closest Gaussian integer is at most .

Principal ideals
An ideal is principal if it consists of all multiples of a single element , that is, it has the form

That is, one has , where  is the quotient.

As all the generators of an ideal have the same norm, the norm of an ideal is the norm of any of its generators.

In some circumstances, it is useful to choose, once for all, a generator for each ideal. There are two classical ways for doing that, both considering first the ideals of odd norm. Thus  has exactly one associate with a real part  that is odd and positive. As this norm is odd, and 3 is not the norm of a Gaussian integer, the norm of the remainder is one, that is, the remainder is a unit.

Gaussian primes
As the Gaussian integers form a principal ideal domain they form also a unique factorization domain. This implies that a Gaussian integer is irreducible (that is, it is not the product of two non-units) if and only if it is prime (that is, it generates a prime ideal).

An associate of a Gaussian prime is also a Gaussian prime. The conjugate of a Gaussian prime is also a Gaussian prime (this implies that Gaussian primes are symmetric about the real and imaginary axes).

A positive integer is a Gaussian prime if and only if it is a prime number that is congruent to 3 modulo 4 (that is, it may be written , with  a nonnegative integer) . The other prime numbers are not Gaussian primes, but each is the product of two conjugate Gaussian primes.

A Gaussian integer  is a Gaussian prime if and only if either:

In other words, a Gaussian integer is a Gaussian prime if and only if either its norm is a prime number, or it is the product of a unit and a prime number of the form .

It follows that there are three cases for the factorization of a prime number  in the Gaussian integers:
If  is congruent to 3 modulo 4, then it is a Gaussian prime; in the language of algebraic number theory,  is said to be inert in the Gaussian integers.
If  is congruent to 1 modulo 4, then it is the product of a Gaussian prime by its conjugate, both of which are non-associated Gaussian primes (neither is the product of the other by a unit);  is said to be a decomposed prime in the Gaussian integers.
If , we have ; that is, 2 is the product of the square of a Gaussian prime by a unit; it is the unique ramified prime in the Gaussian integers.

Unique factorization
As for every unique factorization domain, every Gaussian integer may be factored as a product of a unit and Gaussian primes, and this factorization is unique up to the order of the factors, and the replacement of any prime by any of its associates (together with a corresponding change of the unit factor).

If one chooses, once for all, a fixed Gaussian prime for each equivalence class of associated primes, and if one takes only these selected primes in the factorization, then one obtains a prime factorization which is unique up to the order of the factors. With the choices described above, the resulting unique factorization has the form

either  with  odd and positive, and  even,
An advantage of the second choice is that the selected associates behave well under products for Gaussian integers of odd norm. On the other hand, the selected associate for the real Gaussian primes are negative integers.

Gaussian rationals
The field of Gaussian rationals is the field of fractions of the ring of Gaussian integers. It consists of the complex numbers whose real and imaginary part are both rational.

The ring of Gaussian integers is the integral closure of the integers in the Gaussian rationals.

This implies that Gaussian integers are quadratic integers and that a Gaussian rational is a Gaussian integer, if and only if it is a solution of an equation

In fact  is solution of the equation

Greatest common divisor
That is (where  denotes the divisibility relation),

 and  implies .
Thus, greatest is meant relatively to the divisibility relation, and not for an ordering of the ring (for integers, both meanings of greatest coincide).

The greatest common divisor of two Gaussian integers is not unique, but is defined up to the multiplication by a unit.

where the primes  are pairwise non associated, and the exponents  non-associated, a greatest common divisor is

with

Unfortunately, except in simple cases, the prime factorization is difficult to compute, and Euclidean algorithm leads to a much easier (and faster) computation. This process terminates, because, at each step, the norm of the second Gaussian integer decreases.

This method of computation works always, but is not as simple as for integers because Euclidean division is more complicated. Therefore, a third method is often preferred for hand-written computations. When the greatest common divisor  of these three integers has few factors, then it is easy to test, for common divisor, all Gaussian integers with a norm dividing .

In fact, one has .

Congruences and residue classes

The congruence modulo  is an equivalence relation (also called a congruence relation), which defines a partition of the Gaussian integers into equivalence classes, called here congruence classes or residue classes.

The residue class of a Gaussian integer  is the set

It follows that  if and only if .

Addition and multiplication are compatible with congruences.
This defines well-defined operations (that is independent of the choice of representatives) on the residue classes:

Examples

These two classes form thus a ring with two elements, which is, in fact, a field, the unique (up to an isomorphism) field with two elements, and may thus be identified with the integers modulo 2. These two classes may be considered as a generalization of the partition of integers into even and odd integers. Thus one may speak of even and odd Gaussian integers (Gauss divided further even Gaussian integers into even, that is divisible by 2, and half-even).
For the modulus 2 there are four residue classes, namely . Thus this ring is not isomorphic with the ring of integers modulo 4, another ring with four elements. One has , and thus this ring is not the finite field with four elements, nor the direct product of two copies of the ring of integers modulo 2.
For the modulus  there are eight residue classes, namely , whereof four contain only even Gaussian integers and four contain only odd Gaussian integers.

Describing residue classes

Thus enumerating the residue classes is equivalent with enumerating the possible remainders. This can be done geometrically in the following way.

In the complex plane, one may consider a square grid, whose squares are delimited by the two lines

The semi-open intervals that occur in the definition of  have been chosen in order that every complex number belong to exactly one square; that is, the squares  form a partition of the complex plane. One has

From this one can deduce by geometrical considerations, that the number of residue classes modulo a Gaussian integer  equals its norm  (see below for a proof; similarly, for integers, the number of residue classes modulo  is its absolute value ).

Residue class fields
The residue class ring modulo a Gaussian integer  is a field if and only if  is a Gaussian prime.

If  is a decomposed prime or the ramified prime  (that is, if its norm  is a prime number, which is either 2 or a prime congruent to 1 modulo 4), then the residue class field has a prime number of elements (that is). It is thus isomorphic to the field of the integers modulo .

If, on the other hand,  is an inert prime (that is,  is the square of a prime number, which is congruent to 3 modulo 4), then the residue class field has  elements, and it is an extension of degree 2 (unique, up to an isomorphism) of the prime field with  elements (the integers modulo ).

Primitive residue class group and Euler's totient function
Many theorems (and their proofs) for moduli of integers can be directly transferred to moduli of Gaussian integers, if one replaces the absolute value of the modulus by the norm. This holds especially for the primitive residue class group (also called multiplicative group of integers modulo ) and Euler's totient function. Obviously, this system builds a multiplicative group.

For Gaussian primes it immediately follows that  and for arbitrary composite Gaussian integers

Euler's product formula can be derived as

Also the important theorem of Euler can be directly transferred:

Historical background
The ring of Gaussian integers was introduced by Carl Friedrich Gauss in his second monograph on quartic reciprocity (1832). Gauss discovered that the law of biquadratic reciprocity and its supplements were more easily stated and proved as statements about "whole complex numbers" (i.e. the Gaussian integers) than they are as statements about ordinary whole numbers (i.e. the integers).

In a footnote he notes that the Eisenstein integers are the natural domain for stating and proving results on cubic reciprocity and indicates that similar extensions of the integers are the appropriate domains for studying higher reciprocity laws.

This paper not only introduced the Gaussian integers and proved they are a unique factorization domain, it also introduced the terms norm, unit, primary, and associate, which are now standard in algebraic number theory.

Unsolved problems

Most of the unsolved problems are related to distribution of Gaussian primes in the plane.

Gauss's circle problem does not deal with the Gaussian integers per se, but instead asks for the number of lattice points inside a circle of a given radius centered at the origin. This is equivalent to determining the number of Gaussian integers with norm less than a given value.

There are also conjectures and unsolved problems about the Gaussian primes. Two of them are:
The real and imaginary axes have the infinite set of Gaussian primes 3, 7, 11, 19, ... and their associates. Are there any other lines that have infinitely many Gaussian primes on them? In particular, are there infinitely many Gaussian primes of the form ?
Is it possible to walk to infinity using the Gaussian primes as stepping stones and taking steps of a uniformly bounded length? This is known as the Gaussian moat problem; it was posed in 1962 by Basil Gordon and remains unsolved.

See also
Algebraic integer
Cyclotomic field
Eisenstein integer
Eisenstein prime
Hurwitz quaternion
Proofs of Fermat's theorem on sums of two squares
Proofs of quadratic reciprocity
Quadratic integer
Splitting of prime ideals in Galois extensions describes the structure of prime ideals in the Gaussian integers
Table of Gaussian integer factorizations

Notes

References
; reprinted in Werke, Georg Olms Verlag, Hildesheim, 1973, pp. 93–148. A German translation of this paper is available online in ″H. Maser (ed.): Carl Friedrich Gauss’ Arithmetische Untersuchungen über höhere Arithmetik. Springer, Berlin 1889, pp. 534″.

External links
IMO Compendium text on quadratic extensions and Gaussian Integers in problem solving
Keith Conrad, The Gaussian Integers.

Algebraic numbers
Cyclotomic fields
Lattice points
Quadratic irrational numbers
Integers
Complex numbers